The U.S. Army Combat Capabilities Development Command Aviation & Missile Center (AvMC), formerly known as the U.S. Army Aviation and Missile Research, Development and Engineering Center (AMRDEC), a part of the U.S. Army Research, Development, and Engineering Command (RDECOM) — now DEVCOM, is primarily a civilian organization tasked to provide research, development and engineering technology and services to support U.S. Army aviation and missile platforms. AvMC conducts research, promotes development, engineering and simulation laboratories and facilities used to develop and improve aviation and missile components, subsystems and systems.

AvMC's offices are located at the Redstone Arsenal Army post in Madison County, Alabama.

AvMC employs over 11,000 government, civilian employees and contractors.

Locations 
DEVCOM Aviation & Missile Center is currently headquartered at the Redstone Arsenal in Huntsville, Alabama. DEVCOM Aviation & Missile Center has over 1.9 million square feet of laboratory space that is devoted to improving sensors and electronics, propulsion system, aerodynamic structures, modeling and simulation, life cycle software development, and technical testing.

Other laboratories are found at Joint Base Langley-Eustis and Hampton, Virginia as well as Moffett Field in California where Army and NASA aviation facilities, such as instrumented test ranges and wind tunnels, are used. 

Personnel devoted to aviation sustainment and engineering are located in Corpus Christi, Texas, and serve as liaison engineers around the globe.

History

Early beginnings 
AvMC traces its origins back to October 1948 when the chief of ordnance designated Redstone Arsenal as the center for research and development in the field of rockets. A year later, the secretary of the Army approved the transfer of the Ordnance Research and Development Division sub-office (Rocket) at Fort Bliss, Texas, to Redstone Arsenal. Among those transferred were Dr. Wernher von Braun and his team of German scientists and technicians who had come to the United States after World War II. The Von Braun team is most noted for its pioneering efforts in helping the Army at Redstone lay the foundation for U.S. space exploration.

With the transfer of the Von Braun team to NASA in 1960, research and development activities by the Army at Redstone turned to integrating space-age technology into weapons for the Soldier in the field.

Name changes 

 1962 - The U.S. Army Missile Command (MICOM), including the Directorate of Research and Development, was activated.
 1965 - Redesignated the Research and Development Directorate.
 1968 - Redesignated the Research and Engineering (R&E) Directorate.
 1971 - Redesignated the Directorate for Research, Development, Engineering, and Missile Systems Laboratory (RDE&MSL).
 1972 - Redesignated the Army Missile Research, Development, and Engineering Laboratory (MRDEL).
 1977 - With the establishment of the U.S. Army Missile Research and Development Command (MIRADCOM), the Technology Laboratory and the Engineering Laboratory were born.
 1979 - Reorganized/redesignated as the Army Missile Laboratory (AML) as part of the shift from the dual to the merged command structure of the reinstituted MICOM. Also effective this date, the Engineering Laboratory was realigned and established as the Engineering Directorate.
 1980 - Engineering Directorate functions were placed under AML.
 1985 - Redesignated the Research, Development, and Engineering Center (RDEC) in compliance with AMC directions to establish research, development, and engineering (RD&E) centers.
 1997 – The Aviation RDEC (AVRDEC) and the Missile RDEC (MRDEC) assigned under the U.S. Army Aviation and Missile Command (AMCOM).
 1999/2000 – The Aviation & Missile Research, Development, and Engineering Center (AMRDEC) formed by merging the AVRDEC and the MRDEC.
 2004 - AMRDEC assigned under the new U.S. Army Research, Development and Engineering Command (RDECOM).
 2016 - AMRDEC operationally aligned under AMCOM; administratively aligned under RDECOM.
 2018 - Realigned administratively and operationally with RDECOM. Referred to as RDECOM Aviation & Missile Center.
 2019 - RDECOM Aviation & Missile Center assigned under the Army Futures Command, transition of authority from Army Materiel Command. Referred to as U.S. Army Combat Capabilities Development Command Aviation & Missile Center (DEVCOM AvMC).

See also 
 Multi-Mission Launcher

References 

Madison County, Alabama
Research installations of the United States Army
Military simulation